The Women's dual moguls competition at the FIS Freestyle Ski and Snowboarding World Championships 2019 was held on February 9, 2019.

Qualification

Top half

Bottom half

Finals

References

Women's dual moguls